Pat Broeker (b. 1950), a former high-ranking member of the Church of Scientology, was – along with his wife Annie Broeker – one of the few people in direct contact with L. Ron Hubbard as he became isolated from the public and even from Scientology during his final years.

Scientology
Pat Broeker and his then wife Annie, were the last two intimate companions of L. Ron Hubbard in the months and year prior to his death. At the January 27, 1986, ceremony where it was announced that Hubbard had died, current Scientology leader David Miscavige introduced Broeker and his wife Annie as Hubbard's "two most trusted friends and companions". Some high-ranking, former-members of Scientology have said that L. Ron Hubbard wrote a memo in which he specified that Pat and Annie Broeker should succeed him as the heads of the Church following his death in Flag Order 3879, 19 January 1986, "The Sea Org and the Future", promoting himself to Admiral and appointing them as First and Second Loyal Officers.  Later, however, Miscavige said that the memo was a forgery, and assumed the leadership position himself.

After Scientology
In 2009, Tampa Bay Times reported that after Broeker left the church in 1989 and moved to Colorado, David Miscavige hired private detectives for $32,000 a month. They followed him for the next two decades to Wyoming and ten years in the Czech Republic, where he went to medical school and worked as an English teacher. In early 2012, at an apartment complex owned by the Church of Scientology, his ex-wife Annie died of cancer.

In 2012, Paul Marrick and Greg Arnold, the two private detectives who followed Broeker for 25 years, sued the Church of Scientology for breach of contract when the organization stopped paying them for their investigations. The church said: "The lawsuit filed in Texas on behalf of two out-of-state residents is nothing more than a transparent shakedown effort. This frivolous action stems from a decision to suspend a relationship with two independent contractors who provided various services on behalf of church counsel."

References

External links
 The death of L Ron Hubbard

Further reading 

Scientology
Living people
1950 births
Place of birth missing (living people)